Lt. General Muhammad Safdar (Punjabi and ) is the former Governor of Punjab, the largest province of Pakistan, having served from 1999 to 2001. He has previously also served as the Pakistani Ambassador to Morocco and the Vice Chancellor of Punjab University during 1993.

Army career
Muhammad Safdar belongs to Dulmial, Chakwal Pakistan and is a graduate of Military College Jhelum. Later he joined Pakistan Army. During his military career, Safdar commanded an infantry brigade and the 7th Infantry Division, Peshawar, served as commandant of the Command and Staff College, Quetta from 1982 to 1985 and then reached his professional peak as Chief of General Staff (CGS) in the GHQ having served there from 1986 to 1988. His last military appointment was commandant of the National Defence College from 1988 to 1989. Safdar retired from active service in July 1989.

Political career
Safdar was the Pakistani ambassador to Morocco, vice-chancellor of the Punjab University and then Governor of Punjab. The general stayed as the Governor of Punjab till 29 October 2001, when he was replaced by Lahore Corps Commander Lt. Gen. Khalid Maqbool.

Views
Brigadier (r) Shaukat Qadir, a political and defence analyst, had this to say about command attributes of Safdar, "In the course of my career I came across very few inspiring senior officers; most noteworthy among them was General Safdar, who later became VC Punjab University and, very briefly, Governor Punjab, and whose extraordinary dynamism in peace inspired one to believe that he would be a success in war."

Brigadier (r) Raja Azizur Rehman, a close friend and colleague of the governor, said this about the new governor when he was appointed in 1999, "he is consistent, professionally very sound, cool and calm. Has immense capacity for work and excels in shifting the essentials. He is soft-spoken and likes to listen, He carries a very happy team. He is very clear about his objectives and leaves no stone unturned to achieve that." The general is reputed to be well versed in the art of getting things done.

References

External links
Dawn: Governors of four provinces appointed
Profile of the governor

 

 

Punjabi people
Pakistani generals
Recipients of Hilal-i-Imtiaz
Governors of Punjab, Pakistan
Living people
Ambassadors of Pakistan to Morocco
Vice-Chancellors of the University of the Punjab
Year of birth missing (living people)